Durg is a city in the Indian state of Chhattisgarh, east of the Shivnath River and is part of the Durg-Bhilai urban agglomeration. With an urban population of 1,064,077, Durg-Bhilai is the second largest urban area in Chhattisgarh after Raipur. It is the headquarters of Durg District.

History
Alexander Cunningham, a prominent British archeologist, thought Durg must have been a place of some importance in medieval times as it name literally means "fort".
When the Marathas of Nagpur invaded Chhattisgarh in 1741, they occupied the fort and made it their base of operations.

Demographics
As of 2011 India census, Durg had a population of 268,679. Males constitute 51% of the population and females 49%. Durg has an average literacy rate of 87.36%, male literacy is 92.94% and, female literacy is 81.62%. In Durg, 11% of the population is under 6 years of age.

In the 2011 census, Durg-Bhilainagar Urban Agglomeration had a population of 1,064,077. Durg-Bhilainagar Urban Agglomeration includes: Durg (M Corp.), Bhilai Nagar (M Corp.), Dumardih (part) (OG), Bhilai Charoda (M Corp), Jamul (M), Kumhari (M) and Utai (NP).

Durg Municipal Corporation had a total population of 268,679 in 2011, out of which 136,537 were males and 132,142 were females. Durg had a below six years population of 29,165. Durg had an effective literacy rate (7+ population) of 87.94 per cent and a sex ratio of 968.

Notable people

 Santosh Araswilli, table tennis international medalist
 Saba Anjum Karim, former player, Indian women's national field hockey team
 Bhupesh Baghel, Chief Minister of Chhattisgarh
 Vijay Baghel, MP, Durg Lok Sabha constituency
 Saroj Pandey, mayor, MLA and MP
 Anurag Basu, Indian film Director
 Amit Sana, runner-up in Indian Idol 1
 Tamradhwaj Sahu, Home Minister of Chhattisgarh
 Harpreet Singh,IPL cricketer
 Arun Vora, MLA,Durg City Assembly constituency
 Motilal Vora, treasurer, Indian National Congress
 Aakarshi Kashyap, International badminton player

References

External links

 Official web site of Durg District - http://durg.gov.in/